Preach may refer to:

 "Preach" (M.O song), 2015
 "Preach" (Drake song), 2015
 "Preach" (John Legend song), 2019
 "Preach", a 2014 song by Young Dolph

See also
 License to Preach (Methodist)
 Preacher (disambiguation)
 Preaching, a religious oration or lecture
 Preaching bands, a type of clerical neckwear
 Preaching cross, a Christian cross erected outdoors to designate a preaching place